Bloomington Airport may refer to:
Central Illinois Regional Airport, Bloomington, IL
Monroe County Airport (Indiana), Bloomington, IN
Minneapolis–Saint Paul International Airport, Bloomington, MN